Tony Brown may refer to:

Sports

American football
Tony Brown (offensive lineman) (born 1964), American footballer
Tony Brown (defensive back, born 1970), American footballer
Tony Brown (defensive tackle) (born 1980), American footballer
Tony Brown (defensive back, born 1995), American footballer
Tony Brown (wide receiver) (born 1997), American footballer

Association football
Tony Brown (footballer, born 1945), English forward
Tony Brown (footballer, born 1958), English centre-back

Rugby
Tony Brown (rugby league) (1936–2022), Australian rugby league footballer
Tony Brown (rugby union) (born 1975), New Zealand rugby union footballer

Other sports
Tony Brown (English cricketer) (1936–2020), English cricketer and administrator
Tony Brown (darts player) (1945–2022), English darts player
Tony Brown (basketball) (born 1960), American basketball player and coach
Tony Brown (Australian rules footballer) (born 1977)

Others
Tony Brown (journalist) (born 1933), American commentator and radio talk show host
Tony Brown (record producer) (born 1946), American country music producer and musician
Tony Brown (Manx politician) (born 1950), Chief Minister of the Isle of Man
Tony Brown (Kansas politician) (born 1961), Democratic member of the Kansas House of Representatives
Tony Brown, artist and artistic director of Margolis Brown Adaptors Company

See also 
Anthony Brown (disambiguation)
Anthony Browne (disambiguation)
Tony Browne (born 1973), Irish hurler
Antonio Brown (born 1988), American football wide receiver
Antonio Brown (wide receiver, born 1978)